The Scottish Championships its original name until 1994 also known as the Scottish Lawn Tennis Championships, and the Scottish Grass Court Championships, was an outdoor tennis event held from 1878 through 1994. It was played at various locations throughout its duration including Bridge of Allan, Edinburgh, Glasgow, Moffat, Peebles, and St Andrews in Scotland. The dates the tournament was held fluctuated between June and August annually.

History
The Scottish Lawn Tennis Championships tournament began in 1878. It was originally held at the Grange Club in Edinburgh until 1892. It returned only one more time in 1994. In 1893 the event was played once only in St Andrews. It was then played at Moffat during the late 1890s and most of the 1900s. In 1908 it changed location again and the championships were staged at Bridge of Allan until 1914. The championships returned to Edinburgh for a second time at what would become its semi-permanent home, Craiglockhart, from 1913, 1919 to 1929, then again 1946 through to 1960, 1963, then 1965 to 1975. During all of the 1930s the championships were staged at the Peebles Hotel Hydro courts.  The championships was staged only once during its time in Glasgow in 1958.

The tournament featured both men's and women's singles competition as well as same sex and mixed doubles. The tournament survived for a period of 116 years until 1994.

Between 1997 and 2002, a tournament called The Scottish Tennis Championships was part of the ATP Challenger Tour. It was played at the Craiglockhart Tennis Centre in Edinburgh on green clay courts. The 2015 ATP Challenger Tour indoor event in Glasgow was also called The Scottish Championships.

Finals

Notes: Challenge round: The final round of a tournament, in which the winner of a single-elimination phase faces the previous year's champion, who plays only that one match. The challenge round was used in the early history of tennis (from 1877 through 1921)  in some tournaments, not all. * indicates challenger.

Men's singles

Women's singles

See also
 Tennis in Scotland

Notes

Sources
 Ayre's Lawn Tennis Almanack and Tournament Guide, A. Wallis Myers
 Dunlop Lawn Tennis Almanack and Tournament Guide, G.P. Hughes, 1939 to 1958, published by Dunlop Sports Co. Ltd, UK
 Lowe's Lawn Tennis Annuals and Compendia, Lowe, Sir F. Gordon, Eyre & Spottiswoode
 Myers. Arthur Wallis. (1903), Lawn Tennis at Home Abroad, Charles Scribner and Sons. New York. USA.

External links
 The Tennis Base:Tournament Roll of Honour Scotland Championships

Defunct tennis tournaments in the United Kingdom
Grass court tennis tournaments
Tennis tournaments in Scotland
Recurring sporting events established in 1878
1878 establishments in Scotland
Recurring sporting events disestablished in 1994
1994 disestablishments in Scotland